Chickenpox was a Swedish ska band signed to Burning Heart Records. They existed from 1994 until they broke up in 2002.

Discography

Albums
At Mickey Cohen's Thursdaynight Pokergame (1996, Burning Heart)
Stay Away from the Windows (1998, Burning Heart)
Approved by the Chickenpox (2001, Burning Heart)

Singles & EPs
Dinnerdance and Latenightmusic EP (1994, Burning Heart)
"Anything You Say" (1996, Burning Heart)
"Truth of Our Time" (1998, Burning Heart)

Sources

Band bio @ Burning Heart

Swedish ska groups
Swedish punk rock groups
Burning Heart Records artists